The Moral Animal is a 1994 book by journalist Robert Wright, in which the author explores many aspects of everyday life through evolutionary biology.

Summary

Wright explores many aspects of everyday life through evolutionary biology.  He provides Darwinian explanations for human behavior and psychology, social dynamics and structures, as well as people's relationships with lovers, friends, and family.

Wright borrows extensively from Charles Darwin's better-known publications, including On the Origin of Species (1859), but also from his chronicles and personal writings, illustrating behavioral principles with Darwin's own biographical examples.

Reception
The Moral Animal was a national bestseller and has been published in 12 languages; The New York Times Book Review chose it as one of its eleven Best Books of 1994. The linguist Steven Pinker praised The Moral Animal as a "fiercely intelligent, beautifully written and engrossingly original book" but "found his [Wright's] larger ethical arguments problematic." Neurologist Amy Wax wrote: "One measure of his [Wright's] success is that most of the incoherences in the book can be traced to weaknesses in the body of work he seeks to present, and not in Wright's exposition." The paleontologist Stephen Jay Gould wrote that The Moral Animal presents "pure guesswork" as science, and that the book owes its impact to "good writing and egregiously simplistic argument."

See also 
 Evolutionary ethics
 Evolutionary psychology
 John Stuart Mill
 Kin selection
 Reciprocal altruism
 Richard Dawkins
 Steven Pinker
 The Naked Ape

References

Bibliographical information

External links
 Booknotes interview with Wright on Moral Animal, January 8, 1995.

1994 non-fiction books
Books by Robert Wright (journalist)
English-language books
Evolutionary biology literature
Moral psychology books
Vintage Books books